Traces Screen Printing Ltd.  is recognized for its environmental practice and stewardship in the Region of Waterloo for its use of chemicals that are drain-safe, non-carcinogenic, air-safe, and water-safe.  The company is also devoted to “reduce, re-use, recycle” in all facets of its operations.

Environmental stewardship and recognition
In 1995, Traces Screen Printing Ltd. was featured in a short film produced by Jangles Productions and sponsored by the Municipal Waste Association entitled ”Stop Waste From Adding Up”.

The company’s dedication to protecting and sustaining the environment has been recognized both locally and regionally:

2004 – “Business Excellence Award: Environmental”, Greater Kitchener-Waterloo Chamber of Commerce

2001 – “Environmental Sustainability Award”, Regional Municipality of Waterloo 
1995 – “Environment Award”, Regional Municipality of Waterloo 

1994 – “Environmental Achievement Award”, Greater Kitchener-Waterloo Chamber of Commerce

Company Profile
Traces Screen Printing Ltd. was started in [Waterloo, Ontario] in October 1985 by Tracey Johnston-Aldworth with the help of her father Murray Johnston, a retired engineer and business owner, and her sister, Susan Tata, a model and actress who had recently returned from Los Angeles.  Today, Tracey Johnston-Aldworth is the sole owner of the company which is known for its devotion to the environment, energy conservation, and the community.

References 

Companies based in the Regional Municipality of Waterloo
Screen printing
Service companies of Canada